Q'ara Qullu (Aymara q'ara bare, bald, qullu mountain, "bare mountain", also spelled Khara Kkollu) is a  mountain in the Bolivian Andes. It is located in the La Paz Department, Omasuyos Province, Ancoraimes Municipality. Q'ara Qullu lies northwest of the village of Surijaya.

References 

Mountains of La Paz Department (Bolivia)